Murdock Middle/High School (MMHS) is a public middle/high school located in Winchendon, Massachusetts. The current middle school principal is Jessica L. Vezina, and the current high school principal is Mary Jane Rickson. The superintendent is Thad King. The school implements the Summit Learning program for grades 6-8.

Athletics 
Murdock participates in a wide range of athletics, including cheering, football, soccer, baseball, softball, and basketball.

References

External links
 Middle School Official Website
 High School Official Website

Schools in Worcester County, Massachusetts
Public high schools in Massachusetts
Public middle schools in Massachusetts